Boloria pales, the shepherd's fritillary, is a butterfly of the family Nymphalidae. It is found from the Cantabrian Mountains and the Pyrenees through the Alps and Apennine Mountains east to the Balkan, Carpathian Mountains, the Caucasus and central Asia up to western China.

The wingspan is 25–30 mm. Adults are on wing from June to August depending on the location. There is one generation per year.

The larvae feed on various low growing plants, but prefer Viola species.

External links
 lepiforum.de
 funet.fi
 schmetterlinge-deutschlands.de 
 Fauna Europaea: Taxonomy

Boloria
Butterflies of Europe
Butterflies of Asia
Butterflies described in 1775